The July 1276 papal conclave (2–11 July) was the second of three conclaves in 1276 and elected Pope Adrian V to succeed Pope Innocent V.

References

Sources
 

13th-century elections
1276
Papal conclaves
1276 in Europe
13th-century Catholicism